College of Engineering Roorkee (COER) was established in 1998 by Seth Roshan Lal Jain Trust. It is affiliated to Uttarakhand Technical University.

Academics 
COER provides four-year B.Tech courses and two-year M.Tech courses in various engineering fields.
COER provides two years of Masters in Business Administration and other three years of management courses (Bachelor's degree).

References

External links 

Engineering colleges in Uttarakhand
Education in Roorkee
Educational institutions established in 1998
1998 establishments in Uttar Pradesh